Harper–Chesser House is a historic house listed on the National Register of Historic Places in Georgetown, Texas, United States. The house was built in 1890 by County Judge D.S. Chesser. It is located at 1309 College Street.

Photo gallery

See also

National Register of Historic Places listings in Williamson County, Texas

References

External links
 

Buildings and structures in Georgetown, Texas
Houses completed in 1860
Houses in Williamson County, Texas
Houses on the National Register of Historic Places in Texas
National Register of Historic Places in Williamson County, Texas